Veng Sereyvuth is a Cambodian politician. He belongs to Funcinpec and was elected to represent Prey Veng Province in the National Assembly of Cambodia in 2003.

He also served as Cambodia's Minister of Tourism, until he was superseded by Thong Khon. Now he is the Chairman of the Board Of Trustees in Pannasastra University of Cambodia

References

Members of the National Assembly (Cambodia)
FUNCINPEC politicians
Living people
Year of birth missing (living people)